Unia Tarnów is a Polish football club.

The club was founded in 1928 as a founding section of a multi-sports club.

They currently play in the fourth tier of the Polish football league.

The biggest successes are the semi-finals and quarter-finals of the Polish Cup in the 1968–69 and 1970–71 season respectively.

References

External links
 Official website
 90minut.pl profile

Association football clubs established in 1928
Sport in Lesser Poland Voivodeship
1928 establishments in Poland